Potassium lauryl sulfate (potassium dodecyl sulfate) a detergent similar to sodium lauryl sulfate.  Potassium lauryl sulfate is used in mud soaps. It has a better cleansing action indicated by the presence of the potassium ion (refer Fajans' rules).

References

Potassium compounds
Cleaning product components
Anionic surfactants
Sulfate esters